The following list of current bus routes in Metro Vancouver is sorted by region and route number.

Routes with trolleybuses, articulated buses or suburban highway buses are noted as such. All route destination names are based on the official TransLink bus schedules. All routes are operated by Coast Mountain Bus Company except:
 Routes 214 (off-peak only), 215, 226, 227, 250–256, 258 and 262 (operated by West Vancouver Blue Bus)
 Routes 280–282, 370, 372, and 560–564 (operated by First Transit)

This list is effective as of the service changes on January 2, 2023.

Notes and explanations

General notes

Tag legend 
 Bus/route types:
  (default) – Operates mostly or always with  buses
  – Operates mostly or always with  highway coach buses
  – Operates mostly or always with community shuttle minibuses
  – Operates mostly or always with  articulated buses
  – Operates high frequency service with limited stops, mostly or always with  articulated buses
  – Operates high frequency service with limited stops and transit priority, mostly or always with  articulated buses

 Route specifics:
  – Routing is slightly altered during peak periods (to serve specific locations)
  – Route changes destination without requiring a transfer
  – Route operates a limited number of trips
  – Route operates as an express service with limited stops
  – Route does not operate during evenings and/or late evenings
  – Route does not operate on weekdays
  – Route does not operate on Sundays and/or holidays
  – Route only operates during peak periods (implies )
  – Route only operates during morning peak periods (implies )
  – Route only operates during evening peak periods (implies )
  – Route only operates during evenings and/or late evenings
  – Route only operates on weekdays
  – Route only operates during the summer

Connections legend

Regular routes by region

Vancouver/UBC

Burnaby / New Westminster

Coquitlam / Port Moody / Port Coquitlam

North Vancouver
214 (off-peak), 215, 226 and 227 are operated by West Vancouver Blue Bus.

West Vancouver
All routes are operated by West Vancouver Blue Bus (except route 257).

Bowen Island
These routes are operated by First Transit.

Surrey / North Delta / White Rock

Richmond

Langley

South Delta

Pitt Meadows / Maple Ridge

School specials
These routes are special trips operating to and from high schools, usually before and after school hours, between September and June. Buses on these routes usually show "Special" or "School Special" on their signs. All other school specials use the route number of the closest regular route.

Bike Bus
Bike Bus is a seasonal trial bike service begun in June 2022 supplementing the 620 route running from Bridgeport station to the Tsawwassen ferry terminal. This service runs only on Fridays, weekends and holidays and is timed to connect with ferry arrivals and departures.

NightBus
NightBus service is a late night bus service provided by TransLink. The buses run every 20 or 30 minutes from 1:30–5:15 a.m., seven nights a week. They all leave from Downtown Vancouver and serve most parts of the city plus many suburbs—including Burnaby, New Westminster, Port Moody, Coquitlam, Richmond, Surrey, North Vancouver—as well as provide late-night service along SkyTrain routes when train service is not operating.

Routes not operated by TransLink

Future routes
These routes have been identified in TransLink's 2008 Transportation Plan, Area Transit Plan, Southwest Area Transportation Plan and various open houses for bus service improvements, including the Evergreen Extension. Note that these routes are still in planning stage and they may or may not be implemented, with the exception of the routes that have been confirmed in the first list.  When they are implemented, they may or may not use the same number as originally planned or stated in the following list.

References

External links
 TransLink
 1997 Former bus routes

Bus routes in Metro Vancouver
Vancouver
TransLink (British Columbia)
Vancouver-related lists